Chris Hauty is an American screenwriter born June 27, 1956. He also writes novels; including Deep State, which was published January 2020 by Simon and Schuster.

Filmography
Homeward Bound II: Lost in San Francisco (1996)
Never Back Down (2008)
Never Back Down 2: The Beatdown (2011)
Never Back Down: No Surrender (2016)
Sniper: Ghost Shooter (2016)
Sniper: Ultimate Kill (2017)

References

External links

American screenwriters
Living people
Year of birth missing (living people)